Tan Sri Haji Abdul Aziz bin Haji Mohd Yassin (27 October 1932 – 6 December 2022) is a former Member of Parliament for Muar (1995–1999). He is the brother of the 8th Prime Minister of Malaysia, Tan Sri Muhyiddin Yassin. Before joining politics, he was a government official.

Career 
He is the former Deputy Chairman of Federal Agricultural Marketing Agency (FAMA) in 1965.

Election results

Post political career
He was appointed as the first Yang di-Pertua of the Majlis Bekas Wakil Rakyat Malaysia (MUBARAK) in 2009, an organization for former Barisan Nasional representatives whose establishment was inspired by Tan Sri Muhyiddin Yassin.

He was later appointed as Yang di-Pertua MUBARAK for the Federal Territories from 2014 to 2019.

Honours 
  :
  Officer of the Order of the Defender of the Realm (KMN) (1966)
  Commander of the Order of Loyalty to the Crown of Malaysia (PSM) – Tan Sri (2013)
  :
  Meritorious Service Medal (PJK)

Death
He died at 10.30 am at Kuala Lumpur Hospital.

References 

Former United Malays National Organisation politicians
People from Johor
People from Muar
Malaysian United Indigenous Party politicians
Commanders of the Order of Loyalty to the Crown of Malaysia
Officers of the Order of the Defender of the Realm